Gondrecourt may refer to the following communes in France:
 Gondrecourt-Aix, Meurthe-et-Moselle department, north-eastern France
 Gondrecourt-le-Château, Meuse department, Lorraine, north-eastern France

See also 
 Gondecourt, a commune in the Nord department, northern France